James Duff, 5th Earl Fife,  (6 July 1814 – 7 August 1879) was a Scottish nobleman.

Early life
Duff was the son of Sir Alexander Duff, younger brother of James Duff, 4th Earl Fife, and Anne Stein, the daughter of James Stein of Kilbagie and Kennetpans House.

Career
He was Member of Parliament for Banffshire from 1837 to 1857; his brother, George Skene Duff, was Member of Parliament for Elgin Burghs.   He succeeded as the 5th Earl Fife, 5th Baron Braco of Kilbryde, and 5th Viscount MacDuff on 9 March 1857, and inherited many baronies including MacDuff, named for James Duff, 2nd Earl Fife.  He was also created Baron Skene, of Skene, in the Peerage of the United Kingdom, on 26 September 1857 in his own right, which allowed him to sit and vote in the House of Lords.  He was appointed Knight of the Order of the Thistle (K.T.) in 1860.  

He was appointed Lord Lieutenant of the counties of Banff and Moray.

Personal life
In 1845, Duff resided at 30 Pall Mall, London and at Delgatie Castle.

On 16 March 1846 he married Lady Agnes Georgiana Elizabeth Hay, daughter of William Hay, 18th Earl of Erroll and Lady Elizabeth FitzClarence (an illegitimate daughter of William IV). Together, they were the parents of five children, including:

 Lady Anne Elizabeth Clementine Duff (d. 1925), who married John Townshend, 5th Marquess Townshend, and had issue.
 Lady Ida Louisa Alice Duff (d. 1918), who married firstly Adrian Elias Hope, of Deepdene House, and had one daughter. They were divorced and she married secondly William Wilson, a London stockbroker, with no issue.
 Alexander William George Duff (1849–1912), who was created Duke of Fife in 1889. He married Princess Louise, the eldest daughter of Edward VII.
 Lady Alexina Duff (1851–1882), who married Henry Coventry, third son of Hon. Henry Amilius Coventry, and died without issue.
 Lady Agnes Cecil Emmeline Duff (1852–1925), who married firstly George Hay-Drummond, son of George Hay-Drummond, 12th Earl of Kinnoull, and had issue. She married secondly Herbert Flower (brother of Cyril Flower, 1st Baron Battersea), with no issue. She married thirdly Alfred Cooper, with issue. David Cameron, the former British prime minister, is a descendant of this third marriage.

Lord Fife died on 7 August 1879.

Ancestry

References

External links 
 
 Victor Albert Prout: The Earl of Fife (James Duff, 5th Earl of Fife, 1814 - 1879)

1814 births
1879 deaths
Duff, James
Duff, James
Duff, James
Duff, James
Duff, James
Duff, James
UK MPs who inherited peerages
UK MPs who were granted peerages
Lord-Lieutenants of Banffshire
Lord-Lieutenants of Elginshire
Earls Fife